Esther is a novel by Henry Adams first published in 1884 under the pen name "Frances Snow Compton".

The book was republished in 1938, with an introduction by Robert E. Spiller.

Plot introduction
The comic story deals with a young, freethinking socialite who falls desperately in love with an Episcopal minister. The result is a clash of intellects, a confrontation between faith and reason and a battle of the sexes.

References

External links

1884 American novels
Works published under a pseudonym